Toila Parish is an Estonian municipality located in Ida-Viru County. It has a population of 4,735 (2019) and an area of 266 km².

History 
Toila Parish was formed in the course of the 2017 administrative reform of Estonian municipalities by the merger of Kohtla-Nõmme Parish, the former Toila Rural Municipality and Kohtla Rural Municipality.

Originally, it was also planned to join Jõhvi municipality. At the end of 2022, the municipalities of Toila and Jõhvi started accession talks again.

Settlements
Toila Parish has 2 small boroughs, Toila and Voka, and 9 villages.

Villages
Altküla, Amula, Järve, Kaasikaia, Kaasikvälja, Kabelimetsa, Kohtla, Konju, Kukruse, Martsa, Metsamägara, Mõisamaa, Ontika, Paate, Peeri, Päite, Pühajõe, Roodu, Saka, Servaääre, Täkumetsa, Uikala, Vaivina, Valaste, Vitsiku, Voka

References

External links
 

 
Municipalities of Estonia